Princeton University is an Ivy League university in Princeton, New Jersey, United States. 

Princeton may also refer to:

Schools
Princeton Theological Seminary, Princeton, New Jersey, United States
Princeton Day School, Princeton, New Jersey, United States
Princeton Academy of the Sacred Heart, Princeton, New Jersey, United States
Princeton Friends School, New Jersey, United States
Princeton High School (disambiguation)
Princeton Junior School, Lawrence Township, Mercer County, New Jersey, United States
Princeton Regional Schools, New Jersey, United States
Princeton Secondary School, Princeton, British Columbia, Canada

Places

United States
Princeton, Alabama, an unincorporated community
Princeton, Arkansas, an unincorporated community in Dallas County
Princeton Township, Dallas County, Arkansas
Princeton, California, an unincorporated town in Colusa County
Princeton, California, former name of Mount Bullion, Mariposa County, California
Princeton, Florida, a census-designated place
Princeton, Idaho, an unincorporated census-designated place
Princeton, Illinois, a city and county seat
Princeton Township, Bureau County, Illinois
Princeton, Indiana, a city and county seat
Princeton Township, White County, Indiana
Princeton, Iowa, a city
Princeton Township, Scott County, Iowa
Princeton, Kansas, a city
Princeton, Kentucky, a city and county seat
Princeton, Louisiana, an unincorporated community
Princeton, Maine, a town
Princeton, Massachusetts, a town
Princeton, Minnesota, a city
Princeton Township, Mille Lacs County, Minnesota
Princeton, Missouri, a city and county seat
Princeton, Montana, an unincorporated community
Princeton, Nebraska, an unincorporated community
Princeton, New Jersey, a municipality, and the most populated place named "Princeton"
Borough of Princeton, New Jersey, a former municipality now absorbed into the above
Princeton Township, New Jersey, a former municipality now absorbed into the above
Princeton, North Carolina, a town
Princeton, South Carolina, a census-designated place
Princeton, Texas, a city
Princeton, Newton County, Texas, a ghost town
Princeton, West Virginia, a city and county seat
Princeton, Wisconsin, a city
Princeton (town), Wisconsin
Mount Princeton, Colorado
Princeton Glacier, Alaska

Canada
Princeton, British Columbia, a town
Princeton, Newfoundland and Labrador, a settlement
Princeton, Ontario, a community

Antarctica
Princeton Tarn, Victoria Land, a tarn (mountain lake)

Transportation
Princeton station (Illinois), Amtrak station in Princeton, Illinois, United States
Princeton station (Minnesota), historic station in Princeton, Minnesota, United States
Princeton station (NJ Transit), New Jersey Transit station in Princeton, New Jersey, United States

Other
Princeton (given name)
Princeton, a member of the boy band Mindless Behavior
Princeton, a character in the stage musical Avenue Q
Princeton: A Search for Answers, a 1973 Oscar-winning documentary
Princeton (band), an indie pop band from Los Angeles
Princeton (electronics company), a computer hardware and electronics company in Tokyo, Japan
Battle of Princeton, an American Revolutionary War battle fought in 1777
Chazz Princeton, a character in Yu-Gi-Oh! GX
Fender Princeton, a guitar amplifier
Ivy League (haircut), also known as a Princeton
The Princeton Review, a test preparation service
Ulmus americana 'Princeton', a cultivar of the American elm tree
USS Princeton, various ships
Princeton University Press, an American publisher

See also
Princeton-by-the-Sea, California, an unincorporated community, United States
New Princeton, Oregon, an unincorporated community, United States